AeroItalia SRL is an Italian airline. It operates a fleet of Boeing 737-800s to European destinations from its base at Forlì Airport.

History
The airline was launched in 2022, by an ex-consultant of Italy's ministry of infrastructure and transport, Francesco Gaetano Intrieri, who is AeroItalia's CEO. AeroItalia is economically backed by Germán Efromovich, who is AeroItalia's president, and who was previously the owner of Colombian airline Avianca, and by a French banker named Marc Bourgade.

On 9 July 2022, it started operating scheduled flights from its base in Forlì to domestic destinations as well as Malta and Zakynthos. The airline planned to have flights to the United States and to Latin America by 2023.

Destinations
, AeroItalia flies to the following destinations:

Fleet

, AeroItalia operates the following aircraft, all under Maltese registrations:

See also
List of airlines of Italy

References

Airlines of Italy
Airlines established in 2022
Italian brands
2022 establishments in Italy